Marcelino Mejía Serrano was President of Honduras 8–13 June 1876.

Presidents of Honduras
Year of birth missing
Year of death missing